Adedoyin Olaolu Sanni (born 6 January 1995) is a Nigerian footballer who plays for Italian Lega Pro club L'Aquila, on loan from Pescara.

Biography
Born in Ibadan, Nigeria, Sanni was a youth product of Italian club Brescia. He was a player of the reserve team from 2012 to 2014. In June 2014, Sanni and Bosonin were sold to fellow Serie B club Pescara for €800,000 and €700,000 respectively. However, Brescia also signed Massimo Camilli and Alessio Gabrielli also for €800,000 and €700,000 respectively, making the deal a pure player swap.

Sanni spent 2014–15 season as an overage player of Pescara's reserve.

On 9 July 2015 L'Aquila signed Sanni, Mancini, Bensaja and Savelloni in temporary deals from Pescara .

Sanni scored in his professional debut in the first round of 2015–16 Coppa Italia.

References

External links
 

Nigerian footballers
Brescia Calcio players
Delfino Pescara 1936 players
L'Aquila Calcio 1927 players
Serie C players
Association football defenders
Nigerian expatriate footballers
Nigerian expatriate sportspeople in Italy
Expatriate footballers in Italy
Sportspeople from Ibadan
1995 births
Living people
Yoruba sportspeople
People from Ibadan